Balakot, Nepal  is a village development committee in Parbat District in the Dhawalagiri Zone of central Nepal. At the time of the 1991 Nepal census it had a population of 1566 people living in 293 individual households.

References
 Balkot is in Bhaktapur District not Parbat District.

External links
UN map of the municipalities of Parbat District

Populated places in Parbat District